is a former Japanese football player and current head coach of Tochigi SC. His brother Rui Tokisaki is also a former footballer.

Playing career
Tokisaki was born in Fukushima on June 15, 1979. After graduating from high school, he joined J1 League club Bellmare Hiratsuka (later Shonan Bellmare) in 1998. He could not play at all in the match until 1999. The club was also relegated to J2 League from 2000. In 2000, he debuted and played many matches as center back. Although he could hardly play in the match in 2001, he played many matches in 2002 and 2003. In 2002, he also played as side back not only center back. However he could hardly play in the match from 2004. In June 2005, he moved to J2 club Mito HollyHock. Although he could hardly play in the match in 2005, he played many matches as center back in 2006. In 2007, he moved to his local club FC Pelada Fukushima (later Fukushima United FC) in Regional Leagues. His brother Rui Tokisaki also played for the club from 2007 and they played together until 2011. He played many matches until 2009. He could not play at all in the match from 2010 and retired end of 2011 season.

Coaching career
In 2007, when Tokisaki was player, he moved to his local club FC Pelada Fukushima (later Fukushima United FC) in Regional Leagues and became a playing manager. He managed the club in 2007 season. In September 2008, he became a playing manager again and managed the club until end of 2008 season. After retirement playing career end of 2011 season, he became a manager in 2012. The club was promoted to Japan Football League from 2013. He resigned end of 2013 season. In 2014, he moved to his first club Shonan Bellmare. He coached for youth team until 2016.

Club statistics

References

External links

1979 births
Living people
Association football people from Fukushima Prefecture
Japanese footballers
J1 League players
J2 League players
Shonan Bellmare players
Mito HollyHock players
Fukushima United FC players
Japanese football managers
J2 League managers
J3 League managers
Fukushima United FC managers
Tochigi SC managers
Association football defenders